Count Hans Henric von Essen (26 September 1755 – 28 June 1824)  was a Swedish officer, courtier and statesman.

Biography
Hans Henric von Essen was born at Kavlås Castle in Tidaholm Municipality, Västra Götaland County, Sweden. He was a member of the Essen family. He was educated at Uppsala University. He entered the army, becoming a cornet at age 18. He accompanied Gustav III in his travels and campaigns. He accompanied Gustav III at the 1792 masquerade ball at the Royal Opera House in Stockholm on 16 March 1792, where the king was shot and mortally injured. Hans Henrik von Essen was credited with immediately ordering the doors to the ballroom to be locked, in order not to let the assassin getaway.

In 1788, Hans Henric von Essen was the center of a scandal at the royal court. He had for about ten years been involved in a relationship with the famous lady-in-waiting Augusta von Fersen. In 1788, however, he proposed to Charlotta Eleonora De Geer (1771-1791) and was accepted. His proposal was met with great dislike within the royal court because of sympathy with the popular Augusta von Fersen, and he was challenged to a duel by captain count Adolph Ribbing. Ribbing had also proposed to De Geer but had been declined by her father, which he refused to accept as he believed he had reasons to think that De Geer preferred him and that Essen had proposed because of economic reasons, as De Geer was very wealthy, and as von Essen's proposal and marriage plans were commonly disliked within the court. The duel took place in the royal riding house in the presence of several officers and led to the defeat of von Essen, who was slightly injured. The duel was regarded as a scandal and a crime against the King.

Hans Henrik von Essen was appointed Colonel in 1787, Major General in 1795, and Field Marshal in 1811. He served as the Governor of Stockholm from 1795 to 1797 and as the Governor-General of Pomerania from 1800 to 1809.  Upon the revolution of 1809, he received the title of count and a place in the Council of State.  In 1810 he was sent as Ambassador to Paris by Charles XIII, and his negotiations with Napoleon's ministers restored Pomerania to Sweden.

In 1814, Hans Henrik von Essen served as the commander of the Swedish military forces at the border with Norway. By the Treaty of Kiel, the King of Denmark had to cede Norway to the King of Sweden, due to the alliance of Denmark-Norway with France during the later phases of the Napoleonic Wars. This treaty was however not accepted by the Norwegians. The Norwegian-Swedish War of 1814 was fought in the summer of 1814. Subsequently, the Convention of Moss was signed resulting in the  Union between Sweden and Norway. Hans Henrik von Essen served as the Governor-general of Norway until he was succeeded by Count Carl Carlsson Mörner during 1816.

See also

Norway in 1814

References
Essen, Hans Henrik von in Nordisk familjebok .
Hans Henrik von Essen in Personhistorisk tidskrift .

Notes

1755 births
Swedish duellists
1824 deaths
People from Tidaholm Municipality
Field marshals of Sweden
Governors-General of Sweden
Governors-general of Norway
Swedish Pomerania
Swedish counts
19th-century Swedish politicians
Swedish people of German descent
Gotland
Swedish military commanders of the Napoleonic Wars
Marshals of the Realm
19th-century Swedish military personnel
Swedish courtiers
Essen family